Minuscule 237 (in the Gregory-Aland numbering), A13 (Soden), is a Greek minuscule manuscript of the New Testament, on parchment. Palaeographically it has been assigned to the 11th century.

Description 

The codex contains the text of the four Gospels, on 289 parchment leaves (size ). The biblical text is surrounded by a commentary. A commentary to the Gospel of Mark is an authorship of Victorinus of Pettau. It contains pictures and scholia.

Text 

The Greek text of the codex is a representative of the Byzantine text-type. Aland placed it in Category V.
It was not examined by the Claremont Profile Method.

The Pericope Adulterae (John 7:53-8:11) is placed after John 21:25.

History 

The manuscript was brought from the Athos (monastery Philotheus), by the monk Arsenius, on the suggestion of the Patriarch Nikon († 1681), in the reign of Alexei Mikhailovich Romanov (1645-1676). The manuscript was collated by C. F. Matthaei.

The manuscript is currently housed at the State Historical Museum (V. 85, S. 41) at Moscow.

See also 

 List of New Testament minuscules
 Biblical manuscript
 Textual criticism

References

Further reading 

 Kurt Treu, Die Griechischen Handschriften des Neuen Testaments in der UdSSR; eine systematische Auswertung des Texthandschriften in Leningrad, Moskau, Kiev, Odessa, Tbilisi und Erevan, T & U 90 (Berlin, 1966), pp. 266–267.

Greek New Testament minuscules
11th-century biblical manuscripts